Simon Chiabrishvili (1881 – May 19, 1923), was a Georgian politician, national-democrat and public figure. As a member of the anti-Soviet national-liberation movement in Georgia, he was arrested and executed by the Soviet security services.

Early life and career 
Simon Chiabrishvili was born in the town of Dusheti, Mtiuleti, Georgia.

1881 births
1923 deaths
Politicians from Georgia (country)
People from the Russian Empire